Rakesh Kumar Tripathi (born 14 November 1970) is a screenwriter, lyricist and director based in Kolkata, West Bengal, India.

Career
He did his schooling from Dum Dum KLS Hindi Vidayalaya and completed his degree from St. Paul's Cathedral Mision College. He started his career as a theater activist with a group theatre "Rangakarmee". He worked as a full-time repertory member, received scholarship from Ministry of Culture, India as a repertory member of the group. He spent eight years under guidance of Smt. Usha Ganguly, a recipient of Sangeet Natak Akademi Award. He worked there as an actor, writer as well as a back stage worker. He acted in plays like Rudali (based on a story by Mahasweta Devi), Court Martial (written by Swadesh Deepak), Lokkatha ( a play by Ratnakar Matkari), Mahabhoj (written by Mannu Bhandari), Holi (a play by Mahesh Elkunchuwar), Khoj (written by Usha Ganguly), Maiyyat, Tamasha-dar-Tamasha, Matkaa etc. He, along with the troupe, visited and performed in various cities of the country as well as abroad.

In the year 2000, He went to Mumbai, city of dreams and opportunities to explore new horizons. He worked with 'Nimbus Television' for a short tenure and later wrote several ad films for several products. He came back to his hometown, Kolkata in 2002 to finish a project and since then he is living in Kolkata.

He has written more than ten television serials for different TV channels, worked as an assistant/associate director, and written about 500 songs for films, TV serials. He has also many ad films and jingles to his contribution. He has written dialog and lyrics for a Bhojpuri film, Pistol-ego prem kahani(2009) directed by Rakesh Kumar (who later on directed several popular TV daily soaps) and a Hindi feature film Gumshuda (2010), directed by national award winner director Mr Ashoke Viswanathan, featuring Rajit Kapur, Priyanshu Chatterjee, Simone Singh, Raj Zutshi And Victor Bannerjee in the Main Cast. Rakesh Tripathi had also penned songs for Gumshuda's music album, which was released by HMV saregama.

He wrote a Hindi song for a Bengali feature film titled 'Banobhumi' this was the only original soundtrack in the film and was treated as the theme song of the film.

Many noted singers of Hindi and Bengali music field have sung songs written by Rakesh Tripathi, such as Sonu Nigaam, Sunidhi Chauhan, Shreya Ghoshal, Javed Ali, Shaan, June Bannerjee, Vinod Rathore, Srikanto Acharya, Shubhomita, Raghav, Rupankar, Jojo, Acharya Sanjay Chakraborty, Anweshaa etc. He has translated 10 Tagore songs in Hindi for a music album – "Ravikiran", which was released by 'Saregama' (HMV) in October 2010. The songs of this album were rearranged in a choir form by the maestro Kalyan Sen Barat.

He wrote a Hindi Feature film Panchlait in 2017. The screenplay was based on an eponymous story written by legendary Hindi litterateur Shri Phanishwar Nath 'Renu'. This became the second released film based on his writing after Teesri Kasam, directed by Basu Bhattacharya. Rakesh Tripathi also penned the lyrics of the film and had worked as associate directed in this movie. This film was released on 17 November all over India and participated in several prestigious film festivals of India. It bagged four major awards in 2nd Haryana International Film Festival including Best Inspirational Screenplay Award.

Apart from these, Rakesh has been writing songs for different tableaux displayed at Rajpath, New Delhi during The Republic Day Parade on 26 January since 2015.

He has also written or translated and narrated more than a dozen movies in Hindi language for different science museums and planetariums.

Television
Saheb Biwi Ghulam (Sahara TV) as assistant director and lyricist. 
Behula (Star Jalsha - Bengali) as an assistant director.
75 minutes long Films (specially produced for Tara Channel - Bengali) as an associate director.
Reality shows (for Zee Bangla Channel) as an associate director
Superhit Jhankar (390 episodes of non fictional TV series for Doordarshan Kolkata) as a script writer and associate director.
Ek Nadiya Do Kinare (Daily Soap - Doordarshan) as series writer.
Do Bahnein (TV Series - Doordarshan) as an assistant director, dialog writer and lyricist.
Mukti (TV Series - Doordarshan) as an assistant director, dialog writer and lyricist.

Film  
Tathagata, (a feature film on Buddha) as a Chief Assistant Director  2006
Pukar, (Short film, as assistant director and actor, produced by Films Division of India ) 2006
Banobhumi (lyricist) 2007
Shankardev (short film, produced by Films Division of India ) 2007
Pistol-ego prem kahani (dialog writer/lyricist) 2008
Gumshuda (dialog writer/lyricist) 2010
The Night Of The Interview (dialog writer) 2015
Panchlait,  based on Phanishwar Nath Renu's story (as Script, Lyrics writer and associate director) 2017
Kaala (written lyrics for the song Dharti Pe Haq Hai), Starring Rajinikanth, Nana Patekar, Huma Qureshi, Pankaj Tripathi etc., Directed by Pa. Ranjith, Produced by Dhanush

References

External links 
 Rakesh Tripathi's blog
 website of the film Pistol-ego prem kahani lyric & dialog by Rakesh
 Gumshuda — The Diamond Murders website of the film GUMSHUDA, dialog and lyrics by Rakesh Kumar Tripathi
 Trailer Of Gumshuda
 Trailer of Panchlait

Indian male screenwriters
1970 births
Bengali-language lyricists
Bengali film directors
Living people
Musicians from Kolkata
Indian television writers
Male television writers